Colonia Vichigasta is a municipality and village within the Chilecito Department of La Rioja Province in northwestern Argentina. It is situated immediately west of the larger village and municipality of Vichigasta.

References

Populated places in La Rioja Province, Argentina